Demarest may refer to:

Places
United States
 Demarest, New Jersey, borough in Bergen County
 Demarest (Erie Railroad station), on the National Register of Historic Places
 Demarest Hall, dormitory at Rutgers College

People
 Arthur Demarest (fl. late 20th century), anthropologist noted for his work on the Mayans
 Calvin Demarest (1886–1925), American carom billiards champion
 David Demarest (born 1951), White House Communications Director under George H.W. Bush
 David P. Demarest (1931–2011) American academic and writer
 Ken Demarest, Internet game pioneer and artist
 William Demarest, (1892–1983), American actor
 William Henry Steele Demarest, (1863–1956), American academic

See also
 Demarest House (disambiguation), various places on the National Register of Historic Places
 Demorest (disambiguation)